The Tomahawk Lake Country Club, on  US 385 in Deadwood, South Dakota, was built in 1934.  It was listed on the National Register of Historic Places in 2005.

It is a nine-hole par-3 golf course designed by Lawrence Hughes in the 1930s.

Lawrence Hughes also designed the Thunderbird Country Club in Rancho Mirage, California.

References

External links
Welcome to Tomahawk Lake Country Club

	
National Register of Historic Places in South Dakota
Buildings and structures completed in 1934
Lawrence County, South Dakota
1934 establishments in South Dakota